Bernd Gschweidl (born 8 September 1995) is an Austrian professional footballer who plays for 2. Liga club SKN St. Pölten.

Career
On 12 June 2019, it was confirmed, that Gschweidl had joined SC Rheindorf Altach on a two-year contract. However, he left the club on 14 January 2020 to join SV Ried, signing a deal until the summer 2022. With Ried, he won promotion to the Austrian Bundesliga in 2020. He made 36 league appearances for the club, in which he scored 11 goals.

Prior to the 2021–22 season, Gschweidl returned to now second tier club SKN St. Pölten, where he had earlier played in 2016, signing a contract until June 2023.

Honours
SKN St. Pölten
 2. Liga: 2015–16

SV Ried
 2. Liga: 2019–20

References

External links 
 

1995 births
Living people
Austrian footballers
Austria youth international footballers
Austrian Football Bundesliga players
2. Liga (Austria) players
Austrian Regionalliga players
SKN St. Pölten players
SV Horn players
SV Grödig players
SC Wiener Neustadt players
Wolfsberger AC players
SC Rheindorf Altach players
SV Ried players
Association football forwards
People from Stockerau
Footballers from Lower Austria